Somerset County Cricket Club have played first-class cricket continuously since 1891, and limited overs cricket since its introduction in 1963. English domestic cricket only ever staged finals in limited overs competitions prior to the abridged 2020 season: the first being the 1963 Gillette Cup Final. Somerset reached their first final in 1967, losing to Kent in the same competition. In total, Somerset have appeared in eighteen finals, of which they won seven and lost ten. Their first victory came in the 1979 Gillette Cup Final, which was followed by three more victories in the following four years. After winning the 1983 NatWest Trophy Final, Somerset did not appear in another final until 1999, when they lost to Yorkshire in the same competition.

After winning four of their first six finals, Somerset have only won three of their twelve since. The club finished as runners-up in both domestic finals in each of 2010 and 2011, losing the Friends Provident t20 in 2010 courtesy of having lost more wickets after the match was tied.

Finals

References

Somerset County Cricket Club
Final